Whalers Bay or Whaler's Bay can refer to:

 Whalers Bay (Svalbard)
 Whalers Bay (South Shetland Islands)
 Whalers Bay Whaling Site, Thistle Island, on Thistle Island, South Australia